The Keith Medal was a prize awarded by the Royal Society of Edinburgh, Scotland's national academy, for a scientific paper published in the society's scientific journals, preference being given to a paper containing a discovery, either in mathematics or earth sciences.

The Medal was inaugurated in 1827 as a result of a gift from Alexander Keith of Dunnottar, the first Treasurer of the Society. It was awarded quadrennially, alternately for a paper published in: Proceedings A (Mathematics) or Transactions (Earth and Environmental Sciences). The medal bears the head of John Napier of Merchiston.

The medal is no longer awarded.

Recipients of the Keith Gold Medal
Source (1827 to 1913): Proceedings of the Royal Society of Edinburgh
19th century
1827–29: David Brewster, on his Discovery of Two New Immiscible Fluids in the Cavities of certain Minerals
1829–31: David Brewster, on a New Analysis of Solar Light
1831–33: Thomas Graham, on the Law of the Diffusion of Gases
1833–35: James David Forbes, on the Refraction and Polarization of Heat
1835–37: John Scott Russell, on Hydrodynamics
1837–39: John Shaw, on the Development and Growth of the Salmon
1839–41: Not awarded
1841–43: James David Forbes, on Glaciers
1843–45: Not awarded
1845–47: Sir Thomas Brisbane, for the Makerstoun Observations on Magnetic Phenomena
1847–49: Not awarded
1849–51: Philip Kelland, on General Differentiation, including his more recent Communication on a process of the Differential Calculus, and its application to the solution of certain Differential Equations
1851–53: William John Macquorn Rankine, on the Mechanical Action of Heat
1853–55: Thomas Anderson, on the Crystalline Constituents of Opium, and on the Products of the Destructive Distillation of Animal Substances
1855–57: George Boole, on the Application of the Theory of Probabilities to Questions of the Combination of Testimonies and Judgments
1857–59: Not awarded
1859–61: John Allan Broun, on the Horizontal Force of the Earth’s Magnetism, on the Correction of the Bifilar Magnetometer, and on Terrestrial Magnetism generally
1861–63: William Thomson, on some Kinematical and Dynamical Theorems
1863–65: James David Forbes, for Experimental Inquiry into the Laws of Conduction of Heat in Iron Bars
1865–67: Charles Piazzi Smyth, on Recent Measures at the Great Pyramid
1867–69: Peter Guthrie Tait, on the Rotation of a Rigid Body about a Fixed Point
1869–71: James Clerk Maxwell, on Figures, Frames, and Diagrams of Forces
1871–73: Peter Guthrie Tait, First Approximation to a Thermo-electric Diagram
1873–75: Alexander Crum Brown, on the Sense of Rotation, and on the Anatomical Relations of the Semicircular Canals of the Internal Ear
1875–77: Matthew Forster Heddle, on the Rhombohedral Carbonates and on the Felspars of Scotland
1877–79: Henry Charles Fleeming Jenkin, on the Application of Graphic Methods to the Determination of the Efficiency of Machinery
1879–81: George Chrystal, on the Differential Telephone
1881–83: Sir Thomas Muir, Researches into the Theory of Determinants and Continued Fractions
1883–85: John Aitken, on the Formation of Small Clear Spaces in Dusty Air
1885–87: John Young Buchanan, for a series of communications, extending over several years, on subjects connected with Ocean Circulation, Compressibility of Glass, etc.
1887–89: Edmund Albert Letts, for his papers on the Organic Compounds of Phosphorus
1889–91: Robert Traill Omond, for his contributions to Meteorological Science
1891–93: Sir Thomas Richard Fraser, for his papers on Strophanthus hispidus, Strophanthin, and Strophanthidin
1893–95: Cargill Gilston Knott, for his papers on the Strains produced by Magnetism in Iron and in Nickel
1895–97: Sir Thomas Muir, for his continued communications on Determinants and Allied Questions
1897–99: James Burgess, on the Definite Integral ...

20th/21st century

See also

 List of mathematics awards

References

External links
Awards of Keith Prize 1827-1890
List of recent winners
Announcement of Jenkin's award

British science and technology awards
Mathematics awards
Royal Society of Edinburgh
Scottish awards
1827 establishments in Scotland
Awards established in 1827